The Boldmen CR4 is a two-door roadster produced by German automobile manufacturer Boldmen. It was introduced in 2021.

Development and launch 

In July 2021, Boldmen, which was founded a year earlier by Harald Käs, Michael Käs, and Friedhelm Wiesmann, presented its first car in the form of the 2-door, 2-seat CR4 roadster. The third generation of the BMW Z4 was used as the basis for the development of the vehicle, visually significantly modifying it, also implementing proprietary technical changes.

The Boldmen has developed its own exterior design, with widely spaced headlamps as well as the distinctive hexagonal-shaped centrally located air intake. The rear part of the body has also undergone changes, with a widely spaced Boldmen inscription, as well as the pattern of the front part of the body - lamp shades with cased lenses. The BMW 3-liter six-cylinder B58 engine, which initially powers the Z4 in the M40i variant, has undergone extensive changes. The exhaust system has been redesigned, leaving only the 8-speed automatic transmission unchanged.

See also 

 List of German cars
 Wiesmann

References 

Euro NCAP roadster sports cars
Rear-wheel-drive vehicles
Cars introduced in 2021